Jiyanpur is a town and a nagar panchayat in Azamgarh district in the Indian state of Uttar Pradesh. It lies along State Highway 66.

Geography
It has an average elevation of 70 metres (229 feet).

Demographics
 India census, Jiyanpur had a population of 40578. Males constitute 53% of the population and females 47%Jiyanpur has an average literacy rate of 78%, lower  than the national average of 79.5%: male literacy is 67%, and female literacy is 51%. In Jiyanpur, 19% of the population is under 6 years of age.

References

Cities and towns in Azamgarh district